Bigbig Studios was a British video game developer based in Leamington Spa, England. It was founded in 2001 by a core team of four former Codemasters employees. The company was set up with the help of parent company Evolution Studios.

Bigbig Studios and Evolution Studios were both acquired by Sony Computer Entertainment in September 2007, which was confirmed in an interview and Bigbig Studios were assigned to work exclusively for the portable PlayStation products with the releases of the Pursuit Force games, and MotorStorm: Arctic Edge for the PlayStation Portable and PlayStation 2 plus Little Deviants for the PlayStation Vita 

On 10 January 2012, Sony confirmed that it would close Bigbig Studios.

Games developed

References

External links
 

Companies based in Leamington Spa
British companies established in 2001
Video game companies established in 2001
Video game companies disestablished in 2012
2007 mergers and acquisitions
2001 establishments in England
2012 disestablishments in England
Defunct companies of England
Defunct video game companies of the United Kingdom
PlayStation Studios
Video game development companies
British subsidiaries of foreign companies